The South Africa Sevens is played annually as part of the IRB Sevens World Series for international rugby sevens (seven-a-side version of rugby union). The 2007 competition, which took place on 7 December and 8 December at Outeniqua Park in George, Western Cape, was the second Cup trophy in the 2007–08 IRB Sevens World Series.

In a rematch of the Cup final from the first event in the 2007–08 series, the Dubai Sevens, New Zealand successfully defended their South Africa title by defeating Fiji. The second-level Plate final matched two surprise finalists, with Kenya narrowly defeating a USA team boosted by the presence of emerging 15s star Takudzwa Ngwenya. The Bowl was won by Wales who came from behind to win 21–19 against England. Canada took home the Shield.

Pool stages

Pool A
{| class="wikitable" style="text-align: center;"
|-
!width="200"|Team
!width="40"|Pld
!width="40"|W
!width="40"|D
!width="40"|L
!width="40"|PF
!width="40"|PA
!width="40"|+/-
!width="40"|Pts
|- 
|align=left| 
|3||3||0||0||86||24||+62||9
|-
|align=left| 
|3||2||0||1||32||36||-4||7 
|-
|align=left| 
|3||1||0||2||55||50||+5||5
|-
|align=left| 
|3||0||0||3||17||80||-63||3
|}

Pool B
{| class="wikitable" style="text-align: center;"
|-
!width="200"|Team
!width="40"|Pld
!width="40"|W
!width="40"|D
!width="40"|L
!width="40"|PF
!width="40"|PA
!width="40"|+/-
!width="40"|Pts
|- 
|align=left| 
|3||3||0||0||110||19||+91||9
|-
|align=left| 
|3||2||0||1||36||64||-28||7
|-
|align=left| 
|3||1||0||2||48||62||-14||5
|-
|align=left| 
|3||0||0||3||19||68||-49||3
|}

Pool C
{| class="wikitable" style="text-align: center;"
|-
!width="200"|Team
!width="40"|Pld
!width="40"|W
!width="40"|D
!width="40"|L
!width="40"|PF
!width="40"|PA
!width="40"|+/-
!width="40"|Pts
|- 
|align=left| 
|3||3||0||0||96||7||+89||9
|-
|align=left| 
|3||2||0||1||69||43||+26||7
|- 
|align=left| 
|3||1||0||2||50||55||-5||5
|-
|align=left| 
|3||0||0||3||7||117||-100||3
|}

Pool D
{| class="wikitable" style="text-align: center;"
|-
!width="200"|Team
!width="40"|Pld
!width="40"|W
!width="40"|D
!width="40"|L
!width="40"|PF
!width="40"|PA
!width="40"|+/-
!width="40"|Pts
|- 
|align=left| 
|3||3||0||0||80||40||+40||9
|-
|align=left| 
|3||2||0||1||49||62||-13||7 
|-
|align=left| 
|3||0||1||2||41||53||-12||4
|-
|align=left| 
|3||0||1||2||40||55||-15||4
|}

Knockout

Shield

Bowl

Plate

Cup

Round 2 table

External links
 
 IRB Sevens
 South Africa 7s on irb.com

Sevens
South Africa
South Africa Sevens